The National Socialist German Students' Union (German: Nationalsozialistischer Deutscher Studentenbund, abbreviated NSDStB) was founded in 1926 as a division of the Nazi Party with the mission of integrating University-level education and academic life within the framework of the Nazi worldview.   Organized (as with other departments of the Nazi Party) strictly in accord with the Führerprinzip (or "leader principle") as well as the principle of Machtdistanz (or "power distance"), the NSDStB housed its members in so-called Kameradschaftshäusern (or "Fellowship Houses"), and (from 1930) had its members decked out in classic brown shirts and its own distinctive Swastika emblems.

After Germany's defeat in World War II, the Nazi Party along with its divisions and affiliated organisations were declared "criminal organizations" and banned by the Allied Control Council on October 10, 1945.

Leaders, 1926–45
1926–28 Wilhelm Tempel
1928–32 Baldur von Schirach (from 1931 also Reichsjugendführer)
1932–33 Gerd Rühle(de)
1933–34 Oskar Stäbel(de)
1934–36 Albert Derichsweiler(de)
1936–45 Gustav Adolf Scheel (as Reichsstudentenführer Scheel was also Führer of the Deutschen Studentenschaft)

Other notable members
Kurt Waldheim, later Secretary General of the United Nations, President of Austria.

See also
German Student Union

References

Further reading

Anselm Faust: Der Nationalsozialistische Deutsche Studentenbund. Studenten und Nationalsozialismus in der Weimarer Republik, 2. Bde. Schwann Düsseldorf 1973  and  
Michael Grüttner: Studenten im Dritten Reich, Schöningh Paderborn 1995 
 Andreas Raith, Nationalsozialistischer Deutscher Studentenbund (NSDStB), in: The Lexicon of Bavarian History (8 January 2007)
  
 Die Deutsche Studentenschaft Anfang der 1930er Jahre (1928-1933)
  
 Dokumentation der Bücherverbrennung 1933 in der Universitätsstadt Göttingen unter der Federführung des NSDStB
 Nationalsozialistischer Deutscher Studentenbund: Studentische Organisation der NSDAP (1926-1945)
 

Historical youth organisations based in Germany
1926 establishments in Germany
Student organizations established in 1926
Organizations disestablished in 1945
Student societies in Germany
Nazi Party organizations
Student wings of political parties in Germany
Education in Nazi Germany
Youth wings of fascist parties